Glossop Hall was the last residential building on the site of Royle Hall in Glossop, Derbyshire.

Work started on the penultimate building around 1730 and it was used as a hunting lodge by Phillipa Howard, daughter of Henry Howard, 6th Duke of Norfolk, and her husband. The building as shown was only used for part of the year.
Rebuilt around 1870 by Lord Howard of Glossop and sold to the council in 1924, it became Kingsmoor School and was eventually demolished around 1950. The house lies beneath a small housing estate with road names such as Old Hall Close and Park Close. The original terraced gardens now form Manor Park.

Notes

References

Buildings and structures in Derbyshire
British country houses destroyed in the 20th century
+
Glossop